The Fisherman's Granddaughter is a 1910 American silent film produced by Kalem Company and directed by Sidney Olcott.

Plot summary

The New York Dramatic Mirror summarized the plot: "The old fisherman's granddaughter runs off with a stranger and is married. The old man is at first unforgiving, but his love at last prompts him to put a light in the window for the wayward girl should she ever return. She has a rough time of it, poor girl, her husband deserting her because his wealthy parents object to the marriage. At last she turns her face homeward and the light welcomes her in. The grandfather's heart softens when he sees her and the babe she carries in her arms, and we may suppose that a peaceful future is in store for her."

Production notes
The movie was filmed in Roseland, Florida and included "beautiful scenery" shot along the Saint John's River. The New York–based Kalem Company was the first film studio to do winter production in Florida.

Critical reception 

The Moving Picture World said that The Fisherman's Granddaughter had a "strongly dramatic quality" and that the film was "clearly photographed and admirably acted". The New York Dramatic Mirror described the film: "A simple story, but well told, with good expression and heart interest, is presented in this picture." A reviewer for Variety stated that the film's story, about a romance between a woman of an unnamed island and a sailor, was "an old and familiar one without any action or especial merit".

References

External links 

 A Florida Feud website dedicated to Sidney Olcott

1910 films
1910 short films
1910 drama films
Silent American drama films
American silent short films
Films set in Florida
Films shot in Jacksonville, Florida
Films directed by Sidney Olcott
American black-and-white films
1910s American films